"Ready 2 Go" is a song performed by French DJ and record producer Martin Solveig from his fifth studio album, Smash (2011). It features vocals from British singer Kele Okereke. The dubstep-influenced song was released as the album's second single on 28 March 2011. It peaked at number 20 on the French Singles Chart. It is a secondary theme song of the 2011 Copa América tournament. The song has been featured in the episode "Disturbing Behavior" of The Vampire Diaries  and on its sister show The Secret Circle in the episode "Masked". The Hardwell remix of the song was used for the Iceland sponsorship advert for the 2011 series of I'm a Celebrity...Get Me Out of Here!.

Music video
The music video for the song was uploaded to YouTube on 4 May 2011. The entire 11-minute music video was shot in the Stade de France, during half-time of the football match between France and Croatia, with the participation of many of the 80,000 fans in the stadium. In the video, Solveig comes into the stadium with a majorette, sings on the tape "Ready 2 Go", then begins to dance. Later, he runs around the stadium and fans in the stands brandish square papers of different colors to form the words "Ready to Go".

Track listing
Digital download
"Ready 2 Go" (single edit) – 4:25

German CD single
"Ready 2 Go" (radio edit) – 3:05
"Ready 2 Go" (single edit) – 4:25

UK digital EP
"Ready 2 Go" (UK radio edit) – 2:32
"Ready 2 Go" (single edit) – 10:34
"Ready 2 Go" (club edit) – 6:27
"Ready 2 Go" (Arno Cost Remix) – 6:46
"Ready 2 Go" (Hardwell Remix) – 6:35

Credits
Written by Kele Okereke and Martin Solveig
Composed and produced by Martin Solveig
Published by EMI Music Publishing Ltd. and Temps D'Avance
Lead vocals and backing vocals – Kele Okereke
Instruments, programming and lead vocals (Verse 1) – Martin Solveig
Mixed and mastered by Philippe Weiss at Red Room Studio, Suresnes
Back photography – Romina Shama

Charts

Release history

References

2011 singles
2011 Copa América
Martin Solveig songs
Kele Okereke songs
Songs written by Martin Solveig
2011 songs
Mercury Records singles